Park Royal is an area in North West London, England.

Park Royal may also refer to:
 Park Royal Vehicles
 Park Royal hotels, Mexico
 Park Royal Shopping Centre, West Vancouver, British Columbia, Canada
 Park Royal Exchange, a major transit exchange located at the Park Royal Shopping Centre
 Parkroyal on Pickering, Singapore